Les Fugitifs is a French 1986 comedy film, directed by Francis Veber. It was remade in 1989 as Three Fugitives, also directed by Veber.

Plot 
After serving a five-year sentence for 14 bank robberies, Jean Lucas (Depardieu) is released from prison. He intends to end his criminal lifestyle, but on his release day, when he goes to the bank to open an account, he is taken hostage by François Pignon (Richard), who takes too much time robbing the bank, allowing the police to appear, and accidentally shoots Jean in the leg. However, Lucas' former nemesis, police commissioner Duroc (Maurice Barrier), doesn't believe he is a hostage, given their common past. Lucas forces François to go to the police and confess to being the robber so that Lucas' name would be cleared, but once they arrive at the police station, the police mistake Lucas as the robber, forcing him to escape. François follows, and ends up taking him to Dr. Martin (Jean Carmet), a senile veterinarian friend of his late father, to treat his bullet wound.

François was a former chief of sales at a textile factory, which went out of business three years ago, leaving him unemployed, and his daughter Jeanne (Anaïs Bret) has refused to speak since the death of François' wife around the same time he lost his job. Not wanting to leave his daughter, he asks for Lucas' help to get him a new identity so that he can escape the country. Reluctantly, Lucas contacts his old friend Labib (Jean Benguigui), asking him to hook François up with a fake ID. However, upon meeting, Labib informs François that his price for a new passport has now changed from 2,500 Francs to 500,000. However, François only made away with 84,000 Francs from the robbery. Upon learning this, Labib calls Lucas, threatening to take François to the police if Lucas doesn't get him 500,000 Francs in 24 hours.

With Jeanne in tow, Lucas steals a van and crashes into Labib's bar, rescuing François. François then signs a written confession for Lucas to present to the police. Lucas suggests to François that he turn himself in, for he could get away with just one year in prison. However, just as he prepares to leave, Jeanne, who has come to care for Lucas, asks him to stay. When Lucas refuses, Jeanne runs off. François and Lucas chase her and see her run into a park, where a stranger takes her to the police. Witnessing the police take away his daughter, François decides to kidnap her and leave the country. Lucas suggests that he turn himself in and face the one-year jail time, promising that he'll visit Jeanne in the meantime.

Lucas meets up with Duroc and presents him the written confession, and is vindicated. He takes a job as a locksmith, and goes to visit Jeanne in the orphanage, where she has relapsed into a catatonic state, now even refusing to eat and speak to him. Later that night, François attempts to get Jeanne out of the orphanage, and is soon joined by Lucas. However, at first, Lucas takes the wrong girl from the bed, and when she screams, the police officer guarding Jeanne is alerted. However, she trips on toys and drops her revolver, which François uses to force her to lead him to Jeanne. Lucas and François escape from the orphanage with Jeanne, who is suffering from lack of food. However, Lucas gets a new client in the middle of the night - an intoxicated doctor who, after a night of partying, has lost his keys. After the doctor examines Jeanne, he discovers her very low blood pressure, gives her a pill of tonicardiaque, and advises the men to feed her normally.

Lucas and François break into a house where Jean changed the locks and the owners are on vacation. However, later that night, when he goes to make preparations for leaving the country, Lucas runs into Duroc, who informs him that the police have set up barricades across the country. Realizing that he will not be able to get François and Jeanne across the border, Lucas hatches a plan after finding the family's passports in the house. They dress up and pretend to be the vacationing family - Lucas being the father, François the mother, and Jeanne, after Lucas giving her a haircut, as their son, Jean-Claude - and leave for a cross-country road trip in a stolen Renault 25. To get past a police roadblock, Lucas lies to the policeman that his "wife" is pregnant and about to go in labor. The policeman in charge assigns two motorcycle police to escort them to the hospital, but they don't leave until the orderlies arrive to ferry François inside. However, as soon as they are gone, François jumps up from the stretcher and runs for the car, with Lucas covering it up as a "nervous pregnancy".

Eventually, Lucas, François and Jeanne arrive at the Franco-Italian border, where Lucas points out the way to Italy and promises to visit them one day, intending to stay in France and continue his own life there. When François and Jeanne leave, Lucas watches them disappearing from a distance. However, after seeing François nearly trip on the dress he's wearing as a disguise, Lucas decides to join them.

Cast 
 Pierre Richard as François Pignon
 Gérard Depardieu as Jean Lucas
  as Jeanne Pignon
 Jean Carmet as Dr. Martin, retired veterinarian
 Maurice Barrier as commissaire Duroc
 Jean Benguigui as Labib
 Roland Blanche as Labib's henchman
 Michel Blanc as Dr. Gilbert (uncredited)

Trivia 
The movie takes place in Bordeaux in the French department of Gironde, as evidenced by the license plates on the cars in the movie ending with "33", which, between 1950-2009, was assigned to Gironde.

External links 
 
 

French action comedy films
1986 films
France in fiction
Films set in France
1980s action comedy films
French buddy comedy films
Films directed by Francis Veber
Films with screenplays by Francis Veber
1980s buddy comedy films
Cross-dressing in French films
1980s French-language films
1980s French films